Charles Paget may refer to:

Charles Paget (conspirator) (c. 1546–1612), Roman Catholic conspirator
Sir Charles Paget (politician) (1799–1873), MP for Nottingham in the 1850s
Sir Charles Paget (Royal Navy officer) (1778–1839), MP and vice-admiral
Charles Paget, 6th Marquess of Anglesey (1885–1947), British peer
Charles Paget, 8th Marquess of Anglesey (born 1950), British peer
 Charles Souders Paget (1874–1933), American architect in Canton, China

See also
Charles Paget Wade (1883–1956), British architect and poet